Antonio di Benedetto (2 November 1922 – 10 October 1986) was an Argentine novelist, short story writer and journalist.

Career
Di Benedetto began writing and publishing stories in his adolescence, inspired by the works of Fyodor Dostoevsky and Luigi Pirandello. Mundo Animal, appearing in 1952, was his first story collection and won prestigious awards. A revised version came out in 1971, but the Xenos Books translation uses the first edition to catch the youthful flavor.

Antonio di Benedetto wrote five novels, Zama (1956), considered by critics to be his magnum opus. El silenciero (1964, "The Silentiary") is noteworthy for expressing his intense abhorrence of noise. Critics have compared his works to Alain Robbe-Grillet, Julio Cortázar and Ernesto Sábato.

In 1976, during the military dictatorship of General Videla, di Benedetto was imprisoned and tortured. Released a year later, he went into exile in Spain, then returned home in 1984. He travelled widely and won numerous awards, but never acquired the worldwide fame of other Latin American writers, perhaps because his work was not translated to many languages.

Works
Mundo animal (Animal World).  1952. Translated by H. E. Francis, with an Afterword by Jorge García-Gómez. Grand Terrace, CA: Xenos Books.
Zama 1956. Translated with a foreword by Esther Allen. New York : New York Review Books (NYRB), [2016].
El silenciero 1964.
Las suicidas 1969.

Adaptations
Zama was adapted to film in 2017 by Argentine director Lucrecia Martel and received critical acclaim.

References

External links
Biography (Spanish)
Biography and work (Spanish)

1922 births
1986 deaths
Argentine journalists
Argentine prisoners and detainees
People from Mendoza, Argentina
Torture victims of the Dirty War
Male journalists
20th-century Argentine writers
20th-century Argentine male writers
20th-century novelists
Male novelists
20th-century journalists